Cypripedium californicum, the California lady's slipper, is a member of the orchid genus Cypripedium, the lady's slipper orchids, native to the western United States.

Description

It often grows in very large clumps and each stem can bear up to 21 flowers. It can grow to be up to over a meter in height and has alternate, plicate leaves the length of the stem. The petals and sepals tend to be greenish-brown while the small pouch is pure white with occasional pink spots.

Distribution and habitat
it has a very restricted range and can only be found in the mountains of southwestern Oregon (including the Kalmiopsis Wilderness) and northern California. It prefers the margins of woodland streams in open coniferous forests.

References

  (1997). The Genus Cypripedium (a botanical monograph). Kew Royal Botanic Gardens, Timber Press

External links 
 
 Jepson Flora Project: Cypripedium californicum

californicum
Endemic orchids of the United States
Orchids of California
Flora of Oregon
Flora of the Cascade Range
Flora of the Klamath Mountains
Flora of the Sierra Nevada (United States)
Natural history of the California Coast Ranges
Plants described in 1868